Andy Symons (born 29 June 1991, Harlow) is an English rugby union player. He plays for Vannes in the Pro D2. He previously played for Gloucester, Worcester Warriors, Leicester Tigers, Doncaster Knights, Tasman Makos and Northampton Saints.

He plays as a centre or fly-half.

Symons started his career playing for Saracens Amateurs and Old Albanians, before joining the Saracens academy.

In November 2013, Symons signed for Worcester after spending a season playing for Tasman in the ITM Cup.
Symons made his Worcester debut in an LV Cup win at Cardiff Blues in November 2013 and scored a try on his Aviva Premiership debut against Leicester Tigers at Sixways on 15 November 2013

Symons was to leave Worcester and join older brother Matt at London Irish from the 2016–17 season. However, following Matt's departure it was later announced that he wishes to pursue his career elsewhere and on 9 June 2016 it was announced that Symons would be joining Gloucester Rugby instead.

On March 26, 2018, it was announced that Symons would be moving to Northampton Saints at the end of the 2017/18 season where he remained until June 2020.

On 28 June 2020, Symons would sign for Pro D2 outfit Vannes in France for the 2020-21 season.

References

External links
 Worcester Warriors profile

1991 births
Living people
English rugby union players
Gloucester Rugby players
Leicester Tigers players
Northampton Saints players
Rugby union players from Harlow
Rugby union centres